The Roman Catholic Diocese of Palencia  is a diocese located in the city of Palencia in the ecclesiastical province of Burgos, Spain.

History
The Roman Catholic Diocese of Palencia was established during the 3rd century CE.

Leadership
Pastor (433–57), possibly legendary
Peter I (fl. 506)
Toribius (fl. 527)
Maurila (586–607)
Conantius (607–639)
Ascaric (653–674)
Concorius (c. 670–688)
Baroald (fl. 693)

From 711, the see was abandoned until the 940s.

Julian (940–44)

The see was abandoned again until its definitive reestablishment in 1034.

Bernard I (1035–40)
Miro (1040–63)
Bernard II (1063–85)
Raymond I (1085–1108)
Peter of Agen (1109–39)
Peter II (1139–48)
Raymond II (1148–83)
Arderic (1184–1208)
Adam (1208)
Tello Téllez de Meneses (1208–46)
Rodrigo (4 April 1246 – 1254, Died)
Peter III (1254–1256)
Ferdinand (1256–1265)
Alonso García (8 July 1265 – 1270)
Tello García (1270 – Nov 1274, Died)
Juan Alfonso de Molina (1278–1293)
Munio Zamora, O.P. (5 Feb 1294 – 19 Apr 1300, Died)
Álvaro Carrillo (1297–1306)
Peter (1306–1307) Pedro
Gerardo Domínguez (1309–1313) 
Domingo (1313–1314) 
Gómez Peláez (1313–1320) 
Juan Fernández de Limia (1321–1325)
Pedro de Orfila (1325)
Juan de Saavedra (1325–1342)
Peter V (1342–1343)
Blas (Vasco) Fernández de Toledo (12 Sep 1343 – 17 Jun 1353 Appointed, Archbishop of Toledo)
Reginald de Maubernard (1353–1356)
Gutierre I (1357–1370)
Gutierre Gómez de Luna (1370–1391) 
Juan de Castromocho (1394–1397)
Peter VI (1397–?), anti-bishop
Sancho de Rojas (1406–1415)
Alonso de Argüello (1415–1417)
Rodrigo de Velasco (1417–1426)
Gutierre Álvarez de Toledo (1426–1439)
Pedro Castilla de Eril (6 Apr 1440 – 27 Apr 1461, Died)
Gutierre de la Cueva (1461–1469)
Rodrigo Sánchez de Arévalo (1469–1470) 
Diego Hurtado de Mendoza y Quiñones (13 Feb 1470 – 26 Aug 1485 Appointed, Archbishop of Sevilla)
Alfonso de Burgos, O.P. (1485 – 1499 Died)
Diego Deza, O.P. (7 Feb 1500 Appointed – 30 Oct 1504 Appointed, Archbishop of Sevilla)
Juan Rodríguez de Fonseca (1504 – 5 Jul 1514 Appointed, Bishop of Burgos)
Juan Fernández Velasco (22 Jul 1514 – 1520 Died)
Pedro Ruiz de la Mota, O.S.B. (4 Jul 1520 – 1522 Died)
Antonio de Rojas Manrique (1524 – 3 Jul 1525 Appointed, Bishop of Burgos)
Pedro Gómez Sarmiento de Villandrando (3 Jul 1525 – 8 Jun 1534 Appointed, Archbishop of Santiago de Compostela)
Francisco Mendoza (18 Jan 1534 – 29 Mar 1536 Died)
Luis Cabeza de Vaca (14 Apr 1537 – 22 Nov 1550 Died)
Pedro de la Gasca (6 Apr 1551 – 2 Jun 1561 Appointed, Bishop of Sigüenza)
Cristóbal Fernández Valtodano (2 Jun 1561 – 20 Feb 1570 Appointed, Archbishop of Santiago de Compostela)
Juan Ramírez Zapata de Cárdenas (18 Feb 1570 – 1577 Died)
Alvaro Hurtado de Mendoza y Sarmiento (11 Sep 1577 – 19 Apr 1586 Died)
Fernando Miguel de Prado (17 Aug 1587 – 5 May 1594 Died)
Martín Aspi Sierra (28 May 1597 – 1607 Died)
Felipe Tarsis de Acuña (11 Feb 1608 – 24 Feb 1616 Appointed, Archbishop of Granada)
José González Díez, O.P. (29 Feb 1616 – 28 Jul 1625 Confirmed, Bishop of Pamplona)
Miguel Ayala (18 Aug 1625 – 5 May 1628 Confirmed, Bishop of Calahorra y La Calzada)
Fernando Andrade Sotomayor (29 May 1628 – 10 Nov 1631 Appointed, Bishop of Burgos)
Cristóbal Guzmán Santoyo (6 Jun 1633 – 17 Nov 1656 Died)
Antonio de Estrada Manrique (18 Jun 1657 Confirmed – 17 Jun 1658 Died)
Enrique Peralta y Cárdenas (13 Jan 1659 – 13 Apr 1665 Appointed, Bishop of Burgos)
Gonzalo Bravo de Grajera (27 Jun 1665 – 28 Sep 1671 Appointed, Bishop of Coria)
Juan Molino Navarrete, O.F.M. (8 Dec 1672 – 1 Jan 1685 Died)
Alfonso Lorenzo de Pedraza, O.M. (9 Jul 1685 – 16 Feb 1711 Died)
Esteban Bellido Guevara (18 Sep 1713 – 1 Jan 1717 Died)
Francisco Ochoa Mendarozqueta y Arzamendi (12 Jul 1717 – 25 Dec 1732 Died)
Bartolomé San Martín Orive (2 Dec 1733 – 1740 Died)
José Morales Blanco (3 Jul 1741 – 29 May 1745 Died)
José Ignacio Rodríguez Cornejo (15 Dec 1745 – 23 Feb 1750 Appointed, Bishop of Plasencia)
Andrés Bustamante (16 Mar 1750 – 4 Nov 1764 Died)
José Cayetano Loazes Somoza (5 Jun 1765 – 17 Oct 1769 Died)
Juan Manuel Argüelles (12 Mar 1770 – 26 Jun 1779 Died)
José Luis Mollinedo (18 Sep 1780 – 6 Nov 1800 Died)
Buenaventura Moyano Rodríguez (23 Feb 1801 – 7 Sep 1802 Died)
Francisco Javier Almonacid (16 May 1803 – 13 Sep 1821 Died)
Narciso Coll y Prat (25 Feb 1822 – 30 Dec 1822 Died)
Juan Francisco Martínez y Castrillón (27 Sep 1824 – 23 Jun 1828 Confirmed, Bishop of Málaga)
José Asensio Ocón y Toledo (15 Dec 1828 – 24 Feb 1832 Confirmed, Bishop of Teruel)
Carlos Laborda Clau (26 Nov 1831 – 11 Feb 1853 Died)
Jerónimo Fernández y Andrés (22 Dec 1853 – 23 Mar 1865 Died)
Juan Lozano Torreira (8 Jan 1866 – 4 Jul 1891 Died)
Enrique Almaraz y Santos (19 Jan 1893 – 18 Apr 1907 Appointed, Archbishop of Sevilla)
Valentín García y Barros (18 Apr 1907 – 10 Dec 1914 Died)
Ramón Barberá y Boada (28 May 1914 – 11 Sep 1924 Died)
Agustín Parrado y García (20 May 1925 – 4 Apr 1934 Appointed, Archbishop of Granada)
St. Manuel González y García (5 Aug 1935 – 4 Jan 1940 Died)
Francisco Javer Lauzurica y Torralba (10 Jun 1943 Appointed – 8 Apr 1949 Appointed, Bishop of Oviedo)
José Souto Vizoso (11 Jul 1949 – 31 Mar 1970 Retired)
Anastasio Granados García (31 Mar 1970 – 13 Feb 1978 Died)
Nicolás Antonio Castellanos Franco, O.S.A. (27 Jul 1978 – 4 Sep 1991 Resigned)
Ricardo Blázquez Pérez (26 May 1992 Appointed – 8 Sep 1995 Appointed, Bishop of Bilbao)
Rafael Palmero Ramos (9 Jan 1996 – 26 Nov 2005 Appointed, Bishop of Orihuela–Alicante)
José Ignacio Munilla Aguirre (24 Jun 2006 – 21 Nov 2009 Appointed, Bishop of San Sebastián)
Esteban Escudero Torres (9 Jul 2010 – 7 May 2015 Appointed, Auxiliary Bishop of Valencia)
Manuel Herrero Fernández, O.S.A. (26 Apr 2016 – present)

See also
Roman Catholicism in Spain

References

 GCatholic.org
 Catholic Hierarchy
 website

Roman Catholic dioceses in Spain
Dioceses established in the 3rd century